Haryana Civil Medical Services is the government service in the department of health in Haryana, India.  Doctors are recruited by Haryana Government to work in various government hospitals of Haryana state. The Haryana Civil Medical Services Association has 2,500 members, including 1,400 active doctors. It was set up in 1986, superseding previous organizations of healthcare professionals.  http://www.svayambhuhospital.com/blog.php

References

External links
 Haryana Health deprt
 Haryana Govt Official Website
 Ministry of Health - Govt of India 
 HarSamadhan Haryana Govt's online Complaints portal 

State agencies of Haryana
Health in India by state or union  territory
1986 establishments in Haryana